Central School may refer to:

China
 The Government Central School, now Queen's College, Hong Kong

India
 Kendriya Vidyalaya, (Hindi for Central School), a system of central government schools under the Ministry of Education, Government of India

United Kingdom
 Central school, a historic type of secondary school
 Central School of Speech and Drama, Swiss Cottage, London
 Central School of Art and Design, now Central Saint Martins College of Art and Design, Southampton Row, London
 The Central Tutorial School for Young Musicians, now the Purcell School

United States
 Central School (Peoria, Arizona), listed on the National Register of Historic Places (NRHP) in Maricopa, Arizona
 Central School Auditorium and Gymnasium, Monte Vista, Colorado, NRHP-listed in Rio Grande County
 Central Grammar School, Simsbury, Connecticut; see Horace Belden School and Central Grammar School
 Central School (Milton, Florida)
 Central School (Wilmette, Illinois)
 Central School (Canton, Iowa)
 Central School (Lake City, Iowa)
 Central School (East Lansing, Michigan)
 Central School (Iron River, Michigan)
 Central School (Pontiac, Michigan)
 Central School (Grand Rapids, Minnesota)
 Central Grade School (Winona, Minnesota)
 Central School Campus, De Soto, Missouri
 Central School (Asheboro, North Carolina)
 Central School (Bessemer City, North Carolina)
 Central School Historic District, Kings Mountain, North Carolina
 Central School (Laurinburg, North Carolina)
 Central School (Ticonderoga, New York)
 Central School (Amherst, Ohio), listed on the NRHP in Lorain County, Ohio
 Central School (Martins Ferry, Ohio)
 Central School (Milton-Freewater, Oregon), listed on the NRHP in Umatilla County, Oregon

See also
 Central High School (disambiguation)